Bright is a 2022 young adult romance novel by Jessica Jung, a former member of Korean pop group Girls' Generation. A sequel to her previous work  Shine, the book revolves around a Korean pop singer who faces personal and career challenges while trying to start a fashion brand. Although the book is a work of fiction, some of its plot bears heavy resemblance to events from Jung's career. Bright was published by Simon & Schuster on May 10, 2022.

Plot 

Five years after the events of Shine, 22-year-old Rachel Kim is a successful k-pop idol as lead singer of the group Girls Forever, managed by the company DB Entertainment. She has gained the influence and confidence to stop her groupmates from bullying her, and built friendships with some of them. She still feuds with her rival Mina, the lead dancer of Girls Forever, but has made peace with her ex-boyfriend Jason Lee.

Rachel meets a friend of a friend, investment banker Alex Jeon, and is immediately attracted to him. However, DB Entertainment forbids idols from dating and Rachel knows that she could easily be fired for breaking this rule. Despite this, Rachel exchanges regular text messages with Alex and grows closer to him.

A fashion designer invites Rachel to Paris Fashion Week after praising her outfits online. Rachel, who has loved fashion since childhood, contemplates starting a personal clothing brand after receiving encouragement from several industry professionals. She meets American designer and ex-pop-singer Carly Mattsson, who also encourages her but warns her to "make sure you can spot the difference between bickering and bitterness" with her groupmates. Rachel begins a romantic relationship with Alex.

Rachel learns that she was offered a photo shoot with Vogue, but that DB Entertainment prevented her from hearing about it and told Vogue she declined, then offered her groupmate Eunji as a subject instead. This motivates her to go ahead with her fashion company. She obtains approval for the project from Mr. Noh, the CEO of DB, and begins designing clothes. The members of Girls Forever are torn between happiness for Rachel, envy at her increasing individual fame, and worry that it will distract her from her k-pop duties. Rachel assures them that "Girls Forever is still my number-one priority."

Rachel finds retail sellers for her fashion brand, which she names "RACHEL K.", and takes business advice from Alex. However, her groupmates begin turning against her in small ways, such as stealing her possessions and scheduling extra practices without telling her. Rachel suspects Mina is orchestrating it, but cannot prove anything. Paparazzi begin sniffing around Rachel's involvement with Alex; Mr. Noh wards them off while warning Rachel that even the hint of a scandal could hurt Girls Forever.

Tensions rise among Girls Forever after two members are exposed by paparazzi for having boyfriends; their  images suffer but they are not fired. Feeling paranoid, Rachel cuts back on contact with Alex. She struggles to balance her schedule between group activities, individual work, the fashion brand and personal time. The RACHEL K. brand launches and is an immediate success. However, after Rachel oversleeps and misses a Girls Forever event, the other members label her selfish and neglectful.

Mina leads the rest of Girls Forever in asking Rachel to stop working on her fashion brand until their contracts with DB expire in four years. Rachel refuses and reconciles with Alex, deciding that their relationship is too important to end for her career. The rest of Girls Forever demand that Mr. Noh remove Rachel from the group or they will all quit. Mr. Noh acquiesces, telling Rachel that she will remain with DB until her contract expires and that they will help manage her image during the media speculation. A devastated Rachel is ordered to tell the public she has fallen ill, but she instead announces that she has been forced out of Girls Forever, which causes DB to blacklist her from the entertainment industry.

Carly offers to do a partnership project between RACHEL K. and her own fashion brand, which Rachel accepts. She performs K-pop songs at the promotional event and is pleased to find that she still has many fans. Girls Forever continues to be a successful k-pop group, while Rachel starts working full-time in the fashion industry and goes public about dating Alex.

Reception 

Kirkus Reviews called the book "a glitzy sequel filled with drama and self-discovery" and commented "those interested in relationship dynamics may be left wanting further nuance, but anyone tuning in for more about Rachel's trajectory will enjoy her twists, turns, and personal triumphs." 

K-pop news site Asian Junkie noted that "the interest for most from these YA-type novels from Jessica is obviously derived from getting a quasi-autobiographical honesty about the K-pop industry from somebody who actually used to be a star ... the payoff was indeed as dramatic as one only could’ve dreamed, with things rapidly escalating towards the end." They also called Bright "an extremely easy read."

References 

2022 American novels
American young adult novels
Korean-American novels
Literature by Asian-American women
Simon & Schuster books